Beebe Lake may refer to:
 Beebe Lake (Otter Tail County, Minnesota)
 Beebe Lake (Wright County, Minnesota)
 Beebe Lake (Ithaca, New York)